Margarita Mikhailovna Fomina (born 19 August 1988 in Dmitrov) is a curler from Moscow, Russia.

She was part of Ludmila Privivkova's team that won the 2006 European Curling Championships.

She received her education at the Moscow Institute of Economics and Humanities.

Teammates
2014 Sochi Olympic Games

Anna Sidorova, Skip

Alexandra Saitova, Second

Ekaterina Galkina, Lead

Nkeirouka Ezekh, Alternate

References

External links

Official website of Team Sidorova

1988 births
Living people
People from Dmitrovsky District, Moscow Oblast
Russian female curlers
Curlers at the 2010 Winter Olympics
Curlers at the 2014 Winter Olympics
Olympic curlers of Russia
Medalists at the 2007 Winter Universiade
Russian curling champions
European curling champions
Universiade medalists in curling
Universiade gold medalists for Russia
Universiade silver medalists for Russia
Universiade bronze medalists for Russia
Competitors at the 2007 Winter Universiade
Competitors at the 2009 Winter Universiade
Competitors at the 2011 Winter Universiade
Competitors at the 2013 Winter Universiade
Competitors at the 2015 Winter Universiade
Sportspeople from Moscow Oblast